The Reformed Church of Saint-Symphorien is a Protestant church in Saint-Saphorin, canton of Vaud, Switzerland. It is listed as a heritage site of national significance.

History
The first Catholic church in the region of Lavaux was established by Marius of Avenches around 590 and was dedicated to Symphorian of Autun, as was the church of Avenches. Later, the church gave its name to the village which was previously called Glérolles ( in Latin).

Between the 12th century and the 1536 conquest by the canton of Bern, the village and the church belonged to the Bishops of Lausanne whose last titular, Sebastian of Montfalcon, is shown kneeling in front of the Virgin Mary on the main stained glass of the church. After 1536 and the introduction of the Reformation, the church was used by the Protestants. At this time, Saint-Saphorin was the seat of a parish that included the villages of Rivaz, Chexbres and Puidoux until 1734 when Chexbres and Puidoux formed an independent parish. In 2000, the older parish was re-united under its former name, Saint-Saphorin.

The church of Saint-Symphorien was listed among the Cultural Property of National Significance (Class A), as were the remains of the Gallo-Roman villa located on the site until a tidal wave caused Mount Tauredunum to collapse in 563.

See also
List of cultural property of national significance in Switzerland: Vaud

References

Reformed church buildings in Switzerland
Churches in Vaud
6th-century establishments in Switzerland
6th-century churches
Cultural property of national significance in the canton of Vaud